Earle Thomas Pickering (January 6, 1888 – June 14, 1961) was an American football and baseball coach.  He served as the head football coach at the University of Vermont in 1912, at the University of Arkansas from 1913 to 1914, and at the College of St. Thomas—now known as the University of St. Thomas—in Minnesota in 1915, compiling career college football coaching record of 15–15–1.  Pickering was also the head baseball coach at Arkansas from 1914 to 1915, tallying a mark of 33–12.

Pickering played college football at the University of Minnesota.  He was the captain of the 1911 Minnesota Golden Gophers football team.  At Minnesota he was a member of Theta Delta Chi.

He was born in Geneva, Minnesota in 1888. He died June 14, 1961 in Hennepin County, Minnesota. He is buried in Geneva, his hometown.

Head coaching record

Football

References

External links
 

1888 births
1961 deaths
American football ends
American football fullbacks
Arkansas Razorbacks baseball coaches
Arkansas Razorbacks football coaches
Minnesota Golden Gophers football players
St. Thomas (Minnesota) Tommies football coaches
Vermont Catamounts football coaches
People from Geneva, Minnesota
Players of American football from Minnesota